George Nolfi (born June 10, 1968) is an American filmmaker. He made his directorial debut in 2011 with sci-fi action, romance thriller, The Adjustment Bureau starring Matt Damon and Emily Blunt.

Nolfi's work has been known to blend genres and employ tones ranging from serious to comedic. His stories often have protagonists who are exceptional at what they do; touch on central themes of philosophy, the human condition or world politics; and convey some form of social commentary.

Early life 
Nolfi was born in Boston. He graduated summa cum laude from Princeton University, earning a bachelor's degree in public policy and was awarded a Marshall Scholarship to Oxford University where he studied philosophy. He then entered the PhD program in political science at UCLA with an eye toward a career in government and academia.

Career 
While working on his PhD dissertation at UCLA in 1997, Nolfi sold his first spec script, Pathfinder, in a three-studio bidding war. It would ultimately convince him to change his career path.

In 2003, Nolfi received his first screenwriting credit for the sci-fi film, Timeline, a Michael Crichton bestselling book adaptation starring Paul Walker. His spec screenplay, Honor Among Thieves, was adapted into Ocean’s Twelve (2004) with its all-star ensemble cast led by George Clooney and Brad Pitt. In 2006, Nolfi wrote and co-produced The Sentinelwhich is a political actioner starring Michael Douglas.

Nolfi is uncredited with rewriting the ending for Bourne Supremacy (2004) two weeks before its release. He returned to the Matt Damon spy thriller franchise in 2007 to co-write, Bourne Ultimatum with Tony Gilroy, and Scott Z. Burns.

His continued working relationship with Damon lead to Nolfi's feature directorial debut of The Adjustment Bureau (2011). The film was adapted from the 1954 Philip K. Dick short story classic called “The Adjustment Team,” had been nominated for several awards. The story raises the questions of fate, existentialism - do we control our own destiny?  Among some sci-fi cinephiles, The Adjustment Bureau is considered one of the most underrated sci-fi films.

Nolfi created, executive produced, and served as the principal director for the 2015 espionage television series, Allegiance, which ran for one season on NBC. Allegiance was based on the Israeli television show, The Gordin Cell which was produced in 2011.

Nolfi directed and co-wrote The Banker (2020), starring Anthony Mackie and Samuel L. Jackson. The passion project is based on a true story, brought public awareness to two African American businessmen, heroes of their time and their endeavors to overcome racism and redlining, an issue still prevalent in the U.S. The film has been widely praised, particularly, among the Black community. It continues to be used as an educational tool and to delve into deeper conversations on redlining, business, real estate and generational wealth. In March 2021, The Banker won Outstanding Independent Motion Picture at the 52nd NAACP Image Awards.

To date Nolfi's filmography has collectively grossed over $1 billion at the box office worldwide.

Filmography

References

External links

1960 births
Living people
21st-century American male writers
21st-century American screenwriters
American male screenwriters
Alumni of the University of Oxford
English-language film directors
Film directors from Massachusetts
Film producers from Massachusetts
Princeton University alumni
Screenwriters from Massachusetts
University of California, Los Angeles alumni
Writers from Boston